The 2019–20 Moldovan Under-19 Division was the Moldovan annual football tournament. The season began on 20 August 2019 and the last matches were played on 8 March 2020. On 16 June 2020, the league was abandoned due to COVID-19 pandemic in Moldova. As a result, Sheriff Tiraspol were declared champions.

Stadia and locations

Squads
Players must be born on or after 1 January 2002, with a maximum of five players per team born between 1 January 2001 and 31 December 2001 allowed.

League table
The six clubs will play each other four times for a total of 20 matches per team.

Results 
Matches 1−10

Matches 11−20

References

2019–20 in Moldovan football